is a passenger railway station located in the city of  Akaiwa, Okayama Prefecture, Japan, operated by the West Japan Railway Company (JR West).

Lines

Station layout
Originally, the station consisted of a side platform and an island platform, but in 2014, the overhead wire for the middle track, which had largely been used as a siding (former platform No. 2) was removed. The old No. 3 platform has been renumbered to No. 2 platform. Therefore, at present, is effectively two opposed side platforms and two tracks. The station building is located on the side of the platform for Himeji, and is connected to the island platform for Okayama via a footbridge. This footbridge was certified as a modern industrial heritage in February 2009.

Platforms

History
Kumayama Station was opened on 10 July 1917 and upgraded to a full passenger station on 11 August 1930. With the privatization of Japanese National Railways (JNR) on 1 April 1987, the station came under the control of JR West.

Passenger statistics
In fiscal 2019, the station was used by an average of 1358 passengers daily

Surrounding area
Okayama Hakuryo Junior and Senior High School
Akaiwa Municipal Iwanashi Junior High School
Kumayama ruins

See also
List of railway stations in Japan

References

External links

 JR West Station Official Site

Railway stations in Okayama Prefecture
Sanyō Main Line
Railway stations in Japan opened in 1930
Akaiwa, Okayama